Foundling may refer to:
 An abandoned child, see child abandonment
 Foundling hospital, an institution where abandoned children were cared for
 Foundling Hospital, Dublin, founded 1704
 Foundling Hospital, Cork, founded 1737 
 Foundling Hospital, founded 1739 in London
 Foundling Museum, a museum telling the story of the London Foundling Hospital
 New York Foundling, a child welfare agency

Arts
 Monster Blood Tattoo: Foundling, the first book of the Monster Blood Tattoo fantasy trilogy by D. M. Cornish
 Foundling (album), the ninth studio album by David Gray
 Foundlings (Noon Universe), characters in the fictional Noon Universe created by Arkady and Boris Strugatsky
 The History of Tom Jones, a Foundling, a 1749 novel by Henry Fielding
 "Foundling", a song by Cardiacs from Sing to God
 "Foundling", a song by Stars In Battledress from Leader of the Starry Skies: A Tribute to Tim Smith, Songbook 1

The Foundling may refer to:
 The Foundling (album), a 2010 album by Mary Gauthier
 The Foundling (1915 film), a silent film directed by John B. O'Brien
 The Foundling (1916 film), a remake of the 1915 film, also directed by O'Brien
 The Foundling (1940 film), a 1940 comedy drama
 The Foundling and Other Tales of Prydain, a prequel to Lloyd Alexander's The Chronicles of Prydain
 The Foundling (novel), a 1948 novel by Georgette Heyer
 The Foundling (Leary novel), a 2022 novel by Ann Leary
 The Foundling (play), a 1748 play by Edward Moore